El Hadi Biloum (born 26 May 1981) is an Algerian handball player for Martigues Handball.

He competed for the Algerian national team at the 2015 World Men's Handball Championship in Qatar.

He also participated at the 2003 and 2005 World Championships.

References

1981 births
Living people
Algerian male handball players
Place of birth missing (living people)
21st-century Algerian people